Froglife is a British wildlife charity committed to the conservation of amphibians and reptiles and their associated habitats. The charity aims to encourage as many people as possible, from all walks of life, to get involved in wildlife conservation and habitat protection.

Objectives
The current objectives of Froglife are outlined in the 2009/10 Annual Review:

Conservation objectives
To conserve species and habitats
We will support and implement the creation of habitats for amphibians and reptiles
We will deliver Biodiversity Action Plan outputs at a local and landscape level, working with volunteers and partners
We will build capacity for individuals and organisations involved in the conservation of amphibians and reptiles, working in partnerships, providing training courses and specialist advice

Communication objectives
To communicate knowledge and encourage support
We will get our message out to audiences by ensuring that opportunities to engage with our intended audiences are met, through events, online, through the media and through the production of advice publications
We will generate support for our work by creating opportunities for audiences to engage in our work, through practical hands on action, "citizen-science" recording projects, or through financial support of Froglife's work.
We will show the value that our projects bring by communicating clearly the outcomes of our work, and how these tackle threats to amphibians and reptiles and benefit people's lives in the process.

Learning objectives
To educate and inspire new audiences
We will support people on a lifelong journey of learning about our species, their habitats and the value of biodiversity to human life
We will create new and unique approaches that complement current approaches to conservation education, building on lessons learnt within the sector
We will move forward the education sector, improving policies, skills and resources to support new approaches to conservation education.

Current projects
London Dragon Finder
Scottish Dragon Finder
River Nene Dragon Finder
Toads on roads
Peterborough Green Pathways
Glasgow Green Pathways
FACT (Froglife Active Conservation Team)
Hampton nature reserve
Leapfrog Schools
Garden Wildlife Health

References

 Stock take of garden creatures BBC News website
Froglife confirms its future direction - July 2010"Croaks", Froglife Blog, 21 July 2010

External links
 Official website

Animal charities based in the United Kingdom
Environmental organisations based in the United Kingdom
Organisations based in Peterborough
Organizations established in 1989